Hymenosomatidae is a family of crabs with some 110 described species in nearly 20 genera. The following genera are placed in the Hymenosomatidae:

Amarinus
Apechocinus
Cancrocaeca
Crustaenia
Elamena

Elamenopsis

Guaplax

Halicarcinides

Halicarcinus

Halimena
Hymenicoides
Hymenosoma

Limnopilos
Micas

Neohymenicus
Neorhynchoplax

Odiomaris
Sulaplax

Trigonoplax

References

External links
 Australian Government Department of Environment & Heritage

Crabs
Decapod families